Jen-Chieh Peng (born 1949) is an experimental nuclear physicist at the University of Illinois at Urbana–Champaign.

Education and career
Peng earned his bachelor's degree in physics from Tunghai University in Taiwan in 1970 and his Ph.D. in nuclear physics from the University of Pittsburgh in 1975. He worked as a researcher at the Centre d'Études Nucléaires de Saclay in France before joining the Physics Division of Los Alamos National Laboratory in 1978. Peng joined the faculty at Illinois Physics in 2002 as a full professor.

Peng’s areas of research include partonic structures of hadrons, fundamental symmetries, and neutrino physics. He is a spokesperson or co-spokesperson of some 10 nuclear and particle physics experiments and a coauthor of over 430 journal articles, cited more than 50,000 times

Peng was elected a Fellow of the American Physical Society in 1993 and a Laboratory Fellow at the Los Alamos National Laboratory in 1997. In 2022 he was elected an Academician of the Academia Sinica. In 2022 he received the Tom W. Bonner Prize in Nuclear Physics with the citation "for pioneering work on studying antiquark distributions in the nucleons and nuclei using the Drell-Yan process as an experimental tool, and for seminal work on elucidating the origins of the flavor asymmetries of light-quark sea in the nucleons".

Awards and honors

 Fellow of the American Physical Society. 1993
 Fellow of Los Alamos National Laboratory. 1997
 Breakthrough Prize in Fundamental Physics. 2016
 Distinguished Alumni of Tunghai University. 2020
 Yu-Shan Scholar. 2022
 Academician of Academia Sinica, Taiwan. 2022
 Tom W. Bonner Prize. 2022

References

University of Illinois faculty
Members of Academia Sinica
Fellows of the American Physical Society